Rodriguezia obtusifolia is a species of orchid endemic to eastern Brazil.

References

External links 

obtusifolia
Endemic orchids of Brazil